Anukoolakkobba Ganda is a 1990 Indian Kannada-language film directed by M. S. Rajashekar. The film stars Raghavendra Rajkumar and Vidhyashree in lead roles. The music of the film was composed by Upendra Kumar. The film is a remake of Hindi movie Joroo Ka Ghulam.

Cast

 Raghavendra Rajkumar
 Vidyashree
 Lokesh
 Girija Lokesh
 Prakash Rai
 Sudha Narasimharaju
 Sundarshree
 Rekha Das
 Sridevi
 Shyam Sunder

Soundtrack
All songs are composed by Upendra Kumar.

Track list

References

1990 films
1990s Kannada-language films
Kannada remakes of Hindi films
Indian romantic comedy films
Films scored by Upendra Kumar
Films directed by M. S. Rajashekar
1990 comedy films